Moses Hirsch Enser (1804 – 15 February 1871) was a Galician Maskilic poet and grammarian.

From 1845 he published poetry in Max Emanuel Stern's Hebrew periodical , and in 1854 released Ha-Matseref; ve-hu ha-ḥelek ha-rishon mi-sefer Masaʼat Mosheh ('The Purified; or Moses's Gift'), a grammar book on the past tense. He left in manuscript the books Igrot el Assaf ('Letters to Assaf', on the Hebrew language), Ha-noten zemirot ('The Giver of Tunes', on discernment), an interpretation of Shem-Tov ibn Falaquera's psychological treatise Sefer ha-nefesh ('Book of the Soul'), and a volume of poetry entitled Zera kodesh ('Seed of Holiness').

Publications

References

1804 births
1871 deaths
Hebrew-language poets
Jewish grammarians
Jewish poets
Jews from Galicia (Eastern Europe)
People of the Haskalah
Writers from Lviv